Kebbie Town  is a village in the Rural District in the Western Area of Sierra Leone. It is located about nineteen miles east of Freetown and about 8 miles north of Waterloo. The main industry in Kebbie Town is farming and fishing.

Kebbie Town is mainly inhabited by the Krio people. Most of the population of Kebbie Town are Christians. Kebbie Town  is in very close proximity to the neighborhood towns of  Kerry Town, Cole Town and Rocky.

External links
 http://www.citipedia.info/city/general/Sierra+Leone__Western+Area_Kebbie+Town_id_2407815

Western Area